Jill Scott (born 1952 in Melbourne) is an Australian media artist who lives in Switzerland. Her works are centered around the topics of  Artificial intelligence and the impact of globalization on the human body. She has been living and working in Switzerland as an artist, professor and researcher since 2002. She founded the Artists-in-Labs Residency Program.

Biography 
From 1970 to 1973, Jill Scott studied art .  design at the Victoria College of Advanced Education, Melbourne Australia. She received her diploma in pedagogy at the Melbourne Teachers College at the Melbourne University in Australia in 1975. After that, she lived on the west coast, United States. She completed her master's degree in communication at the San Francisco State University California, USA in 1977.
From 1982 to 1992 she lived and studied in Australia. She graduated from the Center for Advanced Inquiry into the Interactive Arts, University of Wales, UK. Her dissertation has the title:  Digital Body Automata. Exploring the relations between Media, Philosophy and Science .
Since 1992 she has been living in Europe. From 1998 to 2002 she was a professor at the Department of Media at the Bauhaus University Weimar. Since 2003, she has been professor of art and research at the Zurich University of the Arts in Switzerland.
She is also vice-director of the Z-node Program, a graduate program in cooperation with the University of Plymouth in Great Britain. She is co-director and research advisor for the "Artists in labs Residency Program".

Work 
Scott has been described as a video, sculpture and performance artist. Her artwork is focused on the human body and neuroscience. She has also worked on artificial intelligence. Her works are archived internationally. In Germany she is represented in the Media Art Network and the Center for Art and Media Karlsruhe. She had her retrospective at the Experimenta Festival in 1996. The works exhibited deal with cognitive processes of the body.

Exhibitions 
 2005: Museum of Contemporary Art (Lucerne, Switzerland), Lucerne, Switzerland
 2004: Roslyn Oxley Gallery, Sydney, Australia
 2003: Media Banquet, Barcelona and Muadrid, Spain
 2002: E-Phos Media Art Festival, Athens, Greece
 2001: Future Bodies Conference. Cologne, Germany; VIPER New Media Festival, Basel, Switzerland
 2000: Beyond Hierarchy: Vision Ruhr, Zech Zollern 11, Industrial Museum, Dortmund, Germany
1983: Continuum '83, Australian Artists in Japan; Video Gallery SCAN, Tokyo, Japan
 Digital Body Automata. 'WRO Media Festival Fundacia', Warsaw, Poland
 History of the Future. Franklin Furnace Archives, New York, USA

Books 
 Artistsinlabs – Recomposing Art and Science. De Gruyter. 2016 (Eds: Jill Scott and Irene Hediger)
 Transdiscourse 2. Turbulence and Reconstruction. De Gruyter. 2015
 Neuromedia. Art and Science Research. Springer. 2012 (Eds: Jill Scott and Esther Stoeckli)
 Artists-in-labs Networking in the Margins. Springer. 2010 (Editor: Jill Scott)
 Transdiscourse Book Series. Mediated Environments. Springer. 2010 (Eds: Jill Scott and Angelika Hillbeck)
 Artists-in-labs Processes of Inquiry. Springer. 2006. (Editor: Jill Scott)

References 

Living people
1952 births
21st-century Australian women artists
21st-century Australian artists
20th-century Australian women artists
20th-century Australian artists
Women installation artists
Women video artists
Transdisciplinarity